The following is a list of all the major statistics and records for the 2007 Cricket World Cup held in the West Indies from 13 March to 28 April 2007. Though India were eliminated early, they set the ODI record for the highest victory margin in their 257 run win over Bermuda. In their match against Netherlands, Herschelle Gibbs (South Africa) created ODI and International cricket record when he hit sixes off all six deliveries in Daan van Bunge's over. In the Super 8 stage games, Lasith Malinga (Sri Lanka) created ODI record when he took four wickets in four consecutive deliveries in a losing effort against South Africa. By the end of the tournament, new World Cup records for the fastest fifty (20 balls – Brendon McCullum of New Zealand) and fastest hundred (66 balls – Matthew Hayden of Australia) were established. Glenn McGrath established a new Cricket World Cup record for the most wickets (26) and also finished his ODI career with the most wickets in World Cup history (71). The number of sixes in the overall tournament (373) was 40% higher than the previous record holder, the 2003 Cricket World Cup (266). The tournament also saw 32 century partnerships (previous record of 28 during the 1996 Cricket World Cup) and 10 batsmen over 400 runs (previous record of 4 during the 2003 Cricket World Cup).


Records

Team totals

Highest team total
India's total of 413 runs against Bermuda is the current record for the highest score in an innings in a World cup match, bettering Sri Lanka's 398 runs against Kenya in the 1996 Cricket World Cup.

Lowest team total

Bowling

Most wickets in the tournament
McGrath surpassed Akram's record (55 wickets) for the highest number of wickets in World Cup matches, in the game against Bangladesh. His total of 26 wickets was the highest in any single World Cup tournament, and he finished the tournament with 71 wickets in all World Cup matches.

 Note: Only top 10 players shown. Sorted by wickets then bowling average.

Best bowling
Note: Only top ten performances listed.

Batting

Most runs in the tournament
Hayden's 659 runs in the series stands second to only Tendulkar's 673 runs in the 2003 Cricket World Cup. The tournament also saw 10 players exceeding 400 runs for the first time, the previous best being 4 players over 400 runs in world cup tournament (2003 edition).

 Note : Only top 10 players shown.

Highest individual scores
Imran Nazir's 160 is the highest score by any individual in West Indies in ODI and List A matches. Matthew Hayden scored the 100th century in World cup history during his innings of 103 against New Zealand.

Note: Only top ten scores listed.

Highest partnerships of the tournament
The 4th wicket partnership between Brad Hodge and Michael Clarke is the world cup record for that wicket.

Note: Top ten would be listed – eleventh place listed due to equal scores.

Highest partnerships for each wicket

Note:
 * denotes unfinished partnerships.

Most sixes

In an innings
Note: Only listing innings of 5 or more sixes.

In the tournament
Note: Only player with 10 or more. Listed in order of number of sixes, then innings, then surname.

Fielding

Most catches in a match

Most catches in the tournament
Ricky Ponting increased his record number of catches in World cup matches from 17 to 25. Sanath Jayasuriya has moved to second place (18 catches).

Note: Only lists players with 6 catches or more

Wicket-keeping

Most dismissals in a matchNote: only top performance listed (sorted by date)Most dismissals in the tournament
Adam Gilchrist became the first wicket-keeper to reach the milestone of 50 dismissals in all World Cup matches. His tally of seven World Cup stumpings also equals the record held by Pakistan's Moin Khan.Note: Only top 10 players shown.''

Tied match
2007 Cricket World cup saw the third tied match in the tournament history ensuring that this was the third world cup with a tied game (1999 Cricket World Cup – Semifinals between Australia and South Africa and 2003 Cricket World Cup – Group B match between South Africa and Sri Lanka)

References

See also
 Cricket statistics
 Cricket terminology
 Cricket World Cup records
 2003 Cricket World Cup statistics

statistics
Cricket World Cup statistics